Shukhrat Akhmedov (born 17 March 1963) is an Uzbekistani sport shooter. He competed in the 1996 Summer Olympics.

References

1963 births
Living people
Shooters at the 1996 Summer Olympics
Uzbekistani male sport shooters
Olympic shooters of Uzbekistan
Asian Games medalists in shooting
Shooters at the 1994 Asian Games
Shooters at the 1998 Asian Games
Asian Games gold medalists for Uzbekistan
Asian Games silver medalists for Uzbekistan
Asian Games bronze medalists for Uzbekistan
Medalists at the 1994 Asian Games
20th-century Uzbekistani people
21st-century Uzbekistani people